The Alagoas foliage-gleaner (Philydor novaesi) is an extinct passerine bird which was endemic to Brazil.

Taxonomy
This species was first discovered in 1979 at Murici in Alagoas, although there have been few sightings in that area since. In 2003 it was discovered at the Frei Caneca Private Reserve in Pernambuco. Due to its rarity it was classified by BirdLife International as critically endangered.

It is a member of the South American bird family Furnariidae, a group in which many species build elaborate clay nests, giving rise to the English name for the family of "ovenbirds".

Description
Sexes are similar.

Habitat scarcity
The major threat to its existence is habitat destruction, and the clearance of Atlantic forest in Alagoas and Pernambuco has left few other sites likely to support populations of this species. A 2018 study citing bird extinction patterns and the lack of any confirmed sightings since 2011 recommended reclassifying the species as Extinct, and in 2019, the IUCN classified it as so.

The binomial of this bird commemorates the Brazilian ornithologist Fernando da Costa Novaes.

References

External links
Species factsheet - BirdLife International

Alagoas foliage-gleaner
Birds of the Atlantic Forest
Endemic birds of Brazil
Critically endangered animals
Critically endangered biota of South America
Alagoas foliage-gleaner